Gujarat Legislative Assembly or Gujarat Vidhan Sabha is the unicameral legislature of the Indian state of Gujarat, in the state capital Gandhinagar. Presently, 182 members of the Legislative Assembly are directly elected from single-member constituencies (seats). It has a term of 5 years unless it is dissolved sooner. 13 constituencies are reserved for scheduled castes and 27 constituencies for scheduled tribes.  From its majority party group or by way of a grand coalition cabinet of its prominent members, the state's Executive namely the Government of Gujarat is formed.

History 
Since the conclusion of the 2017 Gujarat Legislative Assembly election, the state saw resignations of several MLAs and bye elections on their vacated seats. It started in July 2018, when Congress MLA from Jasdan resigned.He later won the bye election on the Jasdan Assembly constituency on a BJP ticket.
Later in February 2019, Congress MLA from Unjha Assembly constituency resigned. She was followed by Congress MLAs from Manavadar, Dhrangadhra and Jamnagar Rural who resigned and joined BJP.
BJP won bye elections of these vacated seats in May 2019. In June 2019, Four Gujarat BJP MLAs resigned after getting elected to Lok Sabha. MLA from Radhanpur,  Alpesh Thakor who had quit Congress  in April 2019 resigned as MLA along with Bayad MLA Dhavalsinh Zala in July 2019.In the October bye elections, Congress retained Radhanpur,Bayad and gained Tharad, while BJP retained Kheralu, Amraiwadi and gained Lunawada.
 From March to June 2022, 8 Congress MLAs resigned and joined BJP. BJP won bye elections on all their vacated seats with huge margins. In May 2021, BJP won the bye election of Morva Hadaf.

Speakers

Members of Legislative Assembly

See also 
 Elections in Gujarat
 Politics of Gujarat
 Council of Ministers of Gujarat
 List of constituencies of Gujarat Legislative Assembly

External links 
 Gujarat Election 2019 Results Website
 Official definitions of Gujarat Legislative Assembly constituencies

References 

 
Politics of Gujarat
Gujarat